Joan Morales Feliciano (born 8 December 1988) is a Puerto Rican international footballer who plays for Sevilla PR, as a defender.

Career
Morales has played club football for Bayamón and Sevilla PR.

He made his international debut for Puerto Rico in 2010.

References

1988 births
Living people
People from Santurce, Puerto Rico
Puerto Rican footballers
Puerto Rico international footballers
Sevilla FC Puerto Rico players
USL Championship players
Association football defenders